Scipione Gonzaga (1542 – 1593) was an Italian cardinal, chiefly remembered for his friendship and patronage of the troubled poet Torquato Tasso and his support, against other family members, for his cousin Saint Aloysius Gonzaga.

Life
Born on 11 November 1542 in San Martino dall'Argine (or in Mantua according to other sources), he belonged to the family of the Dukes of Sabbioneta, his father Carlo being the Marquess of Gazzuolo. Second-born, he was destinated since his childhood to the ecclesiastic life. He passed his youth under the care of Cardinal Ercole Gonzaga, and made rapid progress in Greek and Latin studies. At Bologna, and later at Padua, he studied mathematics and philosophy, and, in the latter city, founded the Accademia degli Eterei, or Academy of the Ethereals. Throughout his life he patronized literature and men of letters, among the latter being Tasso, who sought his advice concerning his Gerusalemme Liberata, and Guarini, who dedicated to him his Il pastor fido. Gonzaga's home in Rome, the Palazzo Aragona Gonzaga, was a meeting place for the most eminent musicians and intellectuals of the day.

Having finished his theological studies he went to Rome, became cameriere segreto to Pope Pius IV, and was ordained priest on 1 November 1579. In the early years of the reign of Pope Gregory XIII Gonzaga had a serious lawsuit with the Duke of Mantua over some property, but they were soon reconciled. Through the Guise party, whose cause he had aided, he became Bishop of Mende in France, but Charles, Duke of Guise pleaded unsuccessfully with Gregory XIII to have him made cardinal.

Pope Sixtus V, immediately on his elevation, appointed him Latin Patriarch of Jerusalem and on 4 October 1585 he was consecrated bishop by Iñigo Avalos de Aragón, with Enrico Caetani and Annibale de Capua serving as co-consecrators. On 18 December 1587, at the request of the Duke of Mantua, raised him to the cardinalate with the title of cardinal priest of Santa Maria del Popolo. Sixtus also made constant use of his services in the execution of his policies, domestic and foreign.

Cardinal Gonzaga was a friend Charles Borromeo and Philip Neri, and his cousin Aloysius Gonzaga owed him eventual consent of his father to his entering the Society of Jesus. For a time Gonzaga was Governor of the March of Montferrat, in the name of the Marquess Vincenzo.

He died on 11 January 1593 in San Martino dall'Argine, and was buried in the church of Santi Fabiano e Sebastiano in that town.

Works
The three books of his Commentarii, an autobiography written in polished Latin, are an important source of information for the history of his cardinalate; they were edited at Rome in 1791.

Episcopal succession

References 

1542 births
1593 deaths
Scipione
16th-century Italian cardinals
Latin Patriarchs of Jerusalem
Bishops of Mende
16th-century Italian Roman Catholic titular archbishops